A byte is a unit of digital information in computing and telecommunications that most commonly consists of eight bits. 

Byte may also refer to:

Byte (magazine), a computer industry magazine
Byte (song), a song by Martin Garrix and Brooks
Bytes (album), an album by Black Dog Productions
Byte (retailer), a computer retailer in the United Kingdom
Byte (dinghy), a sailing dinghy
Byte, a naming series for electric cars from Byton
Byte (service), a video sharing app.

See also

 Nybble
 Bight (disambiguation)
 Bite (disambiguation)